Cavetown is an English singer-songwriter. The title may also refer to:

 Cavetown Lough, a lake in Ireland
 Cavetown, Maryland, a census-designated place in Maryland, United States
 Cavetown, Virginia, an unincorporated community in Virginia, United States